A citizenship test is an examination, written or oral, required to achieve citizenship in a country.

Debate
The requirements of a citizenship test is a method to control immigration.

Examples
 Australian citizenship test
 Canadian Citizenship Test
 Citizenship of the United States
 Life in the United Kingdom test
 Integration law for immigrants to the Netherlands